Sergio Osmeña, officially the Municipality of Sergio Osmeña Sr.,  is a 2nd class municipality in the province of Zamboanga del Norte, Philippines. According to the 2020 census, it has a population of 31,942 people.

Geography

Barangays
Sergio Osmeña Sr. is politically subdivided into 39 barangays.

Climate

Demographics

Economy

References

External links
 Sergio Osmeña Sr. Profile at PhilAtlas.com
 [ Philippine Standard Geographic Code]
Philippine Census Information

Municipalities of Zamboanga del Norte